Microlenecamptus obsoletus is a species of beetle in the family Cerambycidae. It was described by Fairmaire in 1888, originally under the genus Olenecamptus. It is known from Taiwan and China.

Subspecies
 Microlenecamptus obsoletus albatus (Matsushita, 1933)
 Microlenecamptus obsoletus obsoletus (Fairmaire, 1888)

References

Dorcaschematini
Beetles described in 1888